The Pekka Rautakallio trophy is an ice hockey award given by the Finnish Liiga to the best defenceman of the season. In 1995 the award was renamed to carry the name of its first winner Pekka Rautakallio. In 2019 it was awarded to Oliwer Kaski of Pelicans.

Trophy winners

1977-78:  Pekka Rautakallio (Ässät)
1978-79:  Pekka Rautakallio (Ässät)
1979-80:  Reijo Ruotsalainen (Kärpät)
1980-81:  Reijo Ruotsalainen (Kärpät)
1981-82:  Pertti Lehtonen (HIFK)
1982-83:  Nikolai Makarov (Jokerit)
1983-84:  Tapio Levo (Ässät)
1984-85:  Tapio Levo (Ässät)
1985-86:  Pekka Rautakallio (HIFK)
1986-87:  Hannu Virta (TPS)
1987-88:  Timo Jutila (Tappara)
1988-89:  Hannu Virta (TPS)
1989-90:  Hannu Virta (TPS)
1990-91:  Hannu Virta (TPS)
1991-92:  Harri Laurila (JYP)
1992-93:  Erik Hämäläinen (Jokerit)
1993-94:  Petteri Nummelin (TPS)
1994-95:  Marko Kiprusoff (TPS)
1995-96:  Mika Strömberg (Jokerit)
1996-97:  Brian Rafalski (HPK)
1997-98:  Allan Measures (Ilves)
1998-99:  Brian Rafalski (HIFK)
1999-00:  Toni Lydman (HIFK)
2000-01:  Jouni Loponen (TPS)
2001-02:  Tom Koivisto (Jokerit)
2002-03:  Marko Tuulola (HPK)
2003-04:  Toni Söderholm (HIFK)
2004-05:  Ilkka Mikkola (Kärpät)
2005-06:  Lasse Kukkonen (Kärpät)
2006-07:  Cory Murphy (HIFK)
2007-08:  Arto Laatikainen (Blues)
2008–09:  Markus Seikola (Ilves)
2009–10:  Lee Sweatt (TPS)
2010–11:  Sami Vatanen (JYP)
2011–12:  Sami Vatanen (JYP)
2012–13:  Shaun Heshka (Ässät)
2013-14:  Lasse Kukkonen (Kärpät)
2014-15:  Esa Lindell (Ässät)
2015-16:  Yohann Auvitu (HIFK)
2016-17:  Miika Koivisto (Jukurit)
2017-18:  Miro Heiskanen (HIFK)
2018-19:  Oliwer Kaski (Pelicans)
2019-20:  Matt Caito (KooKoo)

References

Liiga trophies and awards